The Lincolnshire Limestone Formation is a geological formation in England, part of the Inferior Oolite Group of the (Bajocian) Middle Jurassic strata of eastern England. It was formed around 170 million years ago, in a shallow, warm sea on the margin of the London Platform and has estuarine beds above and below it. The maximum known thickness is 40.2 metres, at around TF9730, while four kilometres further west it is 18.3 metres thick at its outcrop in the upper Witham valley. It fades out in the south, around Kettering in Northamptonshire.

There are two sub-divisions, the Upper and Lower Lincolnshire Limestone Members respectively. The dividing marker is the 'Crossi' bed which is distinguished by the fossils of Acanthothris crossi it contains. The Crossi bed forms the top of the Lower Lincolnshire limestone. The bottom of the Lower Lincolnshire limestone has some of the characteristics of the underlying Lower Estuarine Series, in that it tends to contain more than usual amounts of sand. A stone from this part of the formation which was commercially exploited is the Collyweston stone slate which was used for roofing for several centuries. It is now largely replaced in new work by concrete imitations.

Much of the rest of the Lower Lincolnshire limestone is oolitic. It formed in warm, shallow seas where evaporation concentrated the dissolved calcium carbonate and then the precipitated material formed concentric layers building up around a nucleus of, usually, a shell fragment as the sea surface was disturbed by winds rolling the sea-bed material around: the resulting little rounded balls are called ooliths or ooids. It takes its name from its similarity to the hard roe of fish.

See also
 Oolite
 List of types of limestone
 Collyweston stone slate
 Castle Bytham Quarry

References

Bibliography 
 Hains, B.A. & Horton, A. ''British Regional Geology Central England 3rd edn. (1969) 

Limestone
Stratigraphy of the United Kingdom
Geography of Lincolnshire
Bajocian Stage
Jurassic System of Europe